Saunemin is a village in Livingston County, Illinois, United States. The population was 420 at the 2010 census. It was named after a Kickapoo chief.

Geography
Saunemin is located in eastern Livingston County at  (40.892889, -88.406531). Illinois Route 116 passes through the southern side of the village, leading west  to Pontiac, the county seat, and east  to Ashkum. The village limits extend west along Route 116 to the crossroads with Illinois Route 47, which leads north  to Dwight and south  to Forrest.

Demographics

As of the census of 2000, there were 456 people, 155 households, and 121 families residing in the village. The racial makeup of the village was 99.34% White, 0.22% African American, and 0.44% from two or more races. Hispanic or Latino of any race were 1.75% of the population.

There were 155 households, out of which 43.2% had children under the age of 18 living with them, 66.5% were married couples living together, 5.2% had a female householder with no husband present, and 21.9% were non-families. 19.4% of all households were made up of individuals, and 9.7% had someone living alone who was 65 years of age or older. The average household size was 2.94 and the average family size was 3.39.

In the village, the population was spread out, with 33.6% under the age of 18, 7.7% from 18 to 24, 29.6% from 25 to 44, 19.3% from 45 to 64, and 9.9% who were 65 years of age or older. The median age was 32 years. For every 100 females there were 112.1 males. For every 100 females age 18 and over, there were 107.5 males.

The median income for a household in the village was $45,536, and the median income for a family was $46,071. Males had a median income of $35,000 versus $21,591 for females. The per capita income for the village was $15,439. About 5.7% of families and 6.5% of the population were below the poverty line, including 7.3% of those under age 18 and none of those age 65 or over.

Notable people

 George S. Brydia, journalist, salesman, and politician,; born in Saunemin
 Albert Cashier, a transgender man who enlisted in the army during the American Civil War; lived and buried in Saunemin
 Arthur R. Falter, businessman and politician
 Ira M. Lish, businessman and politician

Media 
School scenes from Grandview U.S.A. were shot in and around Saunemin High School, which has since been torn down.

References

External links

Villages in Livingston County, Illinois